Kappela is a 2020 Indian Malayalam-language social drama thriller film written and directed by Muhammad Musthafa (in his directorial debut). Movie produced by Vishnu Venu Under his banner Kadhaas Untold. Starring Anna Ben, Sreenath Bhasi, and Roshan Mathew. The music was composed by Sushin Shyam. The plot follows a phone call romance between an auto rickshaw driver, Vishnu, and a village girl, Jessy, who have never met each other. This film received positive reviews for the cast's performances and social message. After the huge success of film, it is remade in Telugu as Butta Bomma, which marks the Telugu debuts of Anikha Surendran, Surya Vasishta, and Arjun Das.

Plot 
Jessy is the eldest of two daughters from a modest family in the countryside of Wayanad, called Poovaranmala. The lower-middle-class family finds a livelihood by farming and Jessy's mother Mary sews to make money for the family. Jessy has left her studies and  helps out doing household chores and embroidery. Benny, who opens up a textile shop, likes Jessy.

One day, when Jessy returns from town Mary tells her to call one of her clients and confirm the measurements for a blouse. Jessy dials a wrong number and is answered by Vishnu, an auto rickshaw driver from Kozhikode. Vishnu calls her back again a few times, and they gradually develop a romantic relationship without seeing each other. Vishnu lives with two sisters.  He is depicted as a helpful guy who often helps a family take their sick mother to the hospital.

One day, Vishnu's sisters call Jessy and ask her to call Vishnu so they can "see him happy." Jessy and Vishnu talk every day; one day they decide to finally meet up at her church festival. Vishnu had to take a sick mother to the hospital, hence they could not meet, but they continue to talk over the telephone.  Jessy receives a marriage proposal from Benny. Jessy informs Vishnu that Benny and his mother are coming to see her. She asks Vishnu what to do and he suggests that she stay calm. Benny's mother is unimpressed by Jessy's family and their home and storms out when Jessy's mother offers her tea. Benny's mother opposes the marriage.

Jessy is glad and tells Vishnu ; he tells Jessy that his life is hard and she's better off with Benny.  They plan on meeting up one day. Benny insists on marrying Jessy despite his mother's opposition. One day he asks the priest for help with persuading his mother.  The priest encourages him to do what he wants. Benny tells Jessy's family that he wants to marry Jessy no matter what his mother thinks. Jessy informs Vishnu that her engagement is confirmed. Jessy asks whether Vishnu can come to her hometown but he says that someone who knows her may see them together.  When her family goes to invite their relatives to the engagement, Jessy sees this as an opportunity to meet. She travels to Kozhikode by herself to see him.

Once she arrives at Kozhikode, Jessy tries calling Vishnu, as he had promised to meet her at the bus terminal. However, Vishnu loses his phone in a scuffle and a passerby steals it. Roy, who witnessed it, gets the phone from the thief and meets up with Jessy instead. Since Jessy and Vishnu have never seen each other, she thinks Roy is Vishnu. But Vishnu finds her and Roy leaves them, returning the phone.

The couple then tours the city but realises that Roy is following them. Vishnu confronts him and they get into a fight at a park. Vishnu leaves with Jessy and they book a room at a lodge to wash their dirty clothes. The lodge owner, an acquaintance of Vishnu, visits them in the room and asks them if they were going to Mangalore that day. Jessy is confused, but Vishnu pulls the owner out of the room away from her. They then discuss how Vishnu owes money and is now obliged to transport Jessy. The owner also asks him to send pictures of Jessy.

When Vishnu returns, Jessy, who has now become suspicious, tries to leave and go home but Vishnu forces her to stay; however, Roy tracks them down. A fight ensues, during which Roy manages to subdue Vishnu and rescue Jessy. At the same time, the police arrest Vishnu's accomplices from his home. Jessy is unhappy and Roy tries to cheer her up with the help of his cousin. Jessy asks Roy to show her the sea where she washes away her sorrow. The movie ends with her visiting the small mother Mary chapel near her home and offering a candle.

Cast 
 Anna Ben as Jessy
 Sreenath Bhasi as Roy
 Roshan Mathew as Vishnu
 Sudhi Koppa as Benny
 Tanvi Ram as Annie, Roy's cousin
 Vijilesh Karayad as Riyas, Roy's friend
 Nisha Sarang as Mary, Jessy's mother
 James Eliya as Varghese, Jessy's father
Nilja K Baby as Lakshmi, Jessy's friend, Neighbour Girl
 Muhammad Musthafa as Abu
 Sudheesh as Father Gabriel
 Salam Bappu Palapetty
 Navas Vallikkunnu
 Mohammed Eravattoor as Murali
 Jolly Chirayath as Saramma
 Naseer Sankranthi as Martin
Smitha Ambu as Saleena

Production 
Kappela was the directorial debut of actor Muhammad Musthafa, who was also the writer and has appeared in a role in the film. The film was produced by Vishnu Venu through the production company Kadhaas Untold. Jimshi Khalid was the cinematographer and Sushin Shyam composed the music. The film was shot in Poovaranthode, Thenjippalam, Alungal, and Chelapram, Kozhikode.

Accolades 
Kappela was selected in International Film Festival of India (Indian Panorama-2020) and In International Film Festival of Kerala-2020 (Malayalam Cinema Today Section). Anna Ben won the Best Actress Award and Musthafa won the best debut director award in the 51st Kerala State Film Awards. Anna Ben won the SIIMA Award for Best Actress- Critics Choice for her role in 2021 and producer Vishnu Venu won best debut producer award. Anees Nadodi won the National Award for best production design at the 68th National Film Awards.

Soundtrack

The music of the film was composed by Sushin Shyam with lyrics penned by Vishnu Shobhana.

Release
The official trailer of the film was launched by Millennium Audios on 18 February 2020. The film was released in theatres on 6 March 2020 but could not continue its theatrical run due to the COVID-19 pandemic. Later on, the film was released through the online streaming platform Netflix on 22 June 2020. It was screened at 51st International Film Festival of India in January 2021 in Indian Panorama section.

Critical reception
The film received positive reviews from critics. Sajin Shrijith of The New Indian Express rated 4 in a scale of 5 and said that "Kappela is the latest entry from Malayalam cinema that joins the league of films that managed to create something brilliant out of minor incidents. It's yet another testament to the fact that focused writers and directors can do wonders regardless of the scale of the material". Gulf News wrote that "Kappela's writing and screenplay with well-sketched characters is its biggest strength. The narration is simple, the mood and tone rooted in reality, conversations are real as the story glides smoothly like a well-oiled machine lending a fly on the wall experience. [...] The casting is pitch perfect and lead actors Anna Ben, Roshan Mathew and Sreenath Bhasi are fantastic". Baradwaj Rangan of Film Companion South wrote "[These] parts of the film are pure pleasure because “nothing” really happens, and no one is better at capturing and conveying “nothingness” — the unremarkable everydayness of life — than the directors of the Malayalam film industry.".

References

External links 

Kappela on M3db

2020 films
Indian romantic drama films
Films shot in Kozhikode
Films scored by Sushin Shyam
2020s Malayalam-language films
2020 romantic drama films
Malayalam films remade in other languages